Providence Ferry is a lakeside community located north of Lincolnton, Georgia on Lake Thurmond. It is an amenity-low development in that residents rely more on the scenic natural features around them, rather than amenities that require constant fees and upkeep such as tennis courts, club houses, swimming pools and golf courses. The yearly dues are generally considered nominal, and property is available at less of a cost than those in typical amenity-rich neighborhoods.

Providence Ferry itself sold out its first two neighborhoods that were released in July and November 2006 with the exception of a handful of homesites.

External links
 Providence Ferry web site.
 

Unincorporated communities in Georgia (U.S. state)